Anoplodonta is a genus of soldier flies in the family Stratiomyidae.

Species
Anoplodonta fratella (Williston, 1900)
Anoplodonta nigrirostris (Loew, 1866)

References

Stratiomyidae
Brachycera genera
Diptera of North America